Carlene Carter (born Rebecca Carlene Smith; September 26, 1955) is an American country music singer and songwriter. She is the daughter of June Carter Cash and her first husband, Carl Smith.

As of 2020, since 1978, Carter has recorded 12 albums, primarily on major labels. In the same timespan, she has released more than 20 singles, including three number three-peaking hits on the Billboard Hot Country Songs charts.

Career
Carlene Carter's earliest released solo recording was "Friendly Gates", a track included on her stepfather Johnny Cash's 1974 album The Junkie and the Juicehead Minus Me, and credited under the name Carlene Routh.

Her solo recording career began in the late 1970s with her eponymous debut album. In 1979, during a concert at New York City's The Bottom Line, she introduced a song about mate-swapping called "Swap-Meat Rag", from her album Two Sides to Every Woman, by stating, "Well, if that don't put the 'cunt' back in country, I don't know what does." Johnny Cash and June Carter were in the audience, unbeknownst to Carlene.

Carter co-wrote a song with Guy Clark's wife, Susanna Clark, for Emmylou Harris on her 1978 Quarter Moon in a Ten Cent Town album, "Easy From Now On".

In 1983, she had a top-40 hit "I Couldn't Say No", a duet with Robert Ellis Orrall.

In 1987, Carter joined with the singing trio The Carter Sisters, consisting of her mother June Carter Cash and June's sisters Helen and Anita Carter. Together, they formed a revived version of The Carter Family, and were featured on a 1987 television episode of Austin City Limits along with Johnny Cash.

Carter's revived her solo career with the album I Fell in Love, in 1990. The album and title song topped the US country albums and singles charts, respectively. Following a lengthy stint living in the UK and in the run-up to her divorce from English singer-songwriter Nick Lowe, Carter had returned to the U.S., where in 1988 she met musician Howie Epstein, bassist in Tom Petty and The Heartbreakers. Epstein helped Carter get her career back on track, producing I Fell in Love and co-authoring its title track with longtime collaborator, Milwaukee writer Perry M. Lamek. In 1991, the song "I Fell in Love" earned a Grammy nomination for Best Female Country Vocal Performance. The album, which featured straight-ahead, retro-sounding country (unlike her prior work, which had combined country, rock and roll and pop sounds) was among the first successes of the 1990s "neotraditionalist" movement in country.

Three years later, Epstein produced Carter's follow-up CD Little Love Letters, featuring the hit "Every Little Thing", which was one of the top-rated music videos of the year.

Carter provided the voice of Red in the 1994 Williams pinball machine, Red & Ted's Road Show, designed by Pat Lawlor. A clip of Carter's hit, "Every Little Thing", is played after the player scores a jackpot. A picture of Carter appears in the game's back glass artwork.

Carter had a cameo appearance in the 1994 film Maverick. She played a waitress on the gambling casino ship run by Commodore Duvall (James Coburn).

In 1995, Carter's Little Acts of Treason was well received critically, but failed to achieve the commercial success of Carter's two previous releases. In 1996, Carter released Hindsight 20/20, a greatest-hits album, but it failed to achieve success.

She received a small amount of acclaim with the song "It Takes One to Know Me", which was released on the albums Johnny Cash: The Legend and Johnny Cash and June Carter Cash: Duets. Originally recorded in 1977 with a full string backing group, it was lost in a tape collection in Hendersonville, Tennessee,  and then recovered in 2003. It then was remastered by her half-brother John Carter Cash. In the remastered version, John added his wife Laura (Carlene's sister-in-law) and his backing vocals and a guest appearance from Carlene herself—more than 25 years after she wrote and first recorded the song.

In 2005, she was played by Victoria Hester in the movie Walk the Line.

On November 20, 2008, Carlene Carter performed at Iron Horse Music Hall in Northampton, Massachusetts accompanied by Mike Emerson (Elvin Bishop, Tommy Castro) on piano and Sean Allen on electric guitar and later joined by her husband Joe Breen. Alluding to some of her past problems, she said, "I'm really fortunate to have been making records for 30 years...I've had some gaps where I was doing research."

On August 8, 2009, Carlene Carter played a live acoustic set at Heckscher Park in Huntington, New York. During the performance, she stated that it was the first time in more than 30 years that she performed by herself. During her hour-long set, she played the title track from her latest release "Stronger", and said it was written in memory of her younger sister, who had died six years earlier. The track was performed on the piano and brought Carter to tears. Her younger sister is also mentioned in her track "Wildwood Rose". She ended the set by playing "Will the Circle Be Unbroken?" with the opening act: The Homegrown String Band, a family band from the area. She said it brought back memories of playing with her own family.

In 2014, she released her 10th studio album Carter Girl for Rounder Records. The album features 12 tracks written or co-written by members of the Carter Family: 10 pre-existing songs and two new originals. Carter Girl received universal acclaim and includes collaborations with Elizabeth Cook, Willie Nelson, Vince Gill, Kris Kristofferson, and Carter Family members Lorrie Carter Bennett, Helen Carter, Anita Carter, June Carter Cash, and Johnny Cash.

Carter was the opening act on John Mellencamp's 80-date Plain Spoken tour in 2015. Additionally, Carter collaborated extensively with Mellencamp on his 2017 album Sad Clowns & Hillbillies, providing vocals on five tracks, as well as writing one ("Damascus Road") and co-writing another ("Indigo Sunset").

Personal life
Carter is the daughter of June Carter Cash and her first husband, Carl Smith. She is the granddaughter of Maybelle Carter of the Carter Family and the sister of Rosie Nix Adams. In the late 1980s, Carter moved back to Nashville to begin a drug- and alcohol-free life and work on her solo career.

Carlene Carter has been married four times:
 Joseph Simpkins Jr. (1971–1972) (one child, Tiffany Anastasia Lowe, born February 23, 1972)
 Jack Wesley Routh (1974–1977) (one child, John Jackson Routh, born January 15, 1976)
 Nick Lowe (1979–1990) (Carter appears in the music video of Lowe's 1979 single "Cruel to Be Kind" with real footage of their wedding.)
 Joseph Breen (2006–2020)

Carter was for many years linked romantically with the late bass player Howie Epstein, best known for his work with Tom Petty and the Heartbreakers. She lived with him in Tesuque, New Mexico, from 1996 until 2002. On June 26, 2001, a New Mexico police officer pulled over Carter and Epstein. A search of the vehicle found drugs and established the vehicle was stolen. Epstein died in 2003 of a suspected drug overdose.

Discography (studio albums)

Carlene Carter (1978)
Two Sides to Every Woman (1979)
Musical Shapes (1980)
Blue Nun (1981)
C'est C Bon (1983)
I Fell in Love (1990)
Little Love Letters (1993)
Little Acts of Treason (1995)
Stronger (2008)
Carter Girl (2014)
Sad Clowns & Hillbillies (with John Mellencamp) (2017)

References

Further reading
Everett, Todd (1998). "Carlene Carter". In The Encyclopedia of Country Music. New York: Oxford University Press. pp. 82–3.

External links
 
 

1955 births
People from Nashville, Tennessee
Country musicians from Tennessee
American women country singers
American country singer-songwriters
American expatriates in England
Living people
Giant Records (Warner) artists
Johnny Cash
Cash–Carter family
People from Tesuque, New Mexico
Singer-songwriters from Tennessee

 http://www.carlenecarter.net